Hiroshi Hara may refer to:

 Hiroshi Hara (architect) (born 1936), Japanese architect
 Hiroshi Hara (botanist) (1911–1986), Japanese botanist
 Hiroshi Hara (composer) (1933–2002), Japanese composer